Jane Gilbert may refer to:
 Jane Gilbert (educationalist), New Zealand educationalist
 Jane Gilbert (actress) (1909–1985), American actress